Intharacha or In Racha, a nephew of Borommarachathirat I and former Lord of Suphanburi who had finally taken the Ayutthayan throne for the Suphannaphum Dynasty, reigned as the sixth king of Ayutthaya (1408–1424).

Upon his death, his two elder sons fought to the death in single combat aboard elephants. The throne then went to the youngest brother.

Ancestry

References

1359 births
1424 deaths
Suphannaphum dynasty
Kings of Ayutthaya
15th-century monarchs in Asia
Princes of Ayutthaya
15th-century Thai people
14th-century Thai people